Football is currently the second-most popular sport in Bangladesh, after cricket, and is governed by the Bangladesh Football Federation (BFF). An interest in cricket resulting from the nation's success in Test cricket and participation in the Cricket World Cup overshadowed the past fame in the nation's football legacy. However, this did not affect football's popularity. More and more football tournaments are being organised in and outside Dhaka than of any other sports and football fever grips the nation during every FIFA World Cup as well as Copa America and UEFA European Championship. Federation officials and experts are still hopeful about the development of football in the country within the next ten years despite huge financial obstacles, inadequate technical adaptation and lack of professionalism.

History

Origins

Before Independence in 1971, the 30s and 40s saw the football rivalry between Kolkata and Dhaka started under DSA (Dhaka Sporting Association), which was mainly created to develop players on the east. The majority of the team was made out of students from Dhaka University, when they defeated Islington Corinthians 1–0, on 22 November 1937 . During the liberation war in 1971, football was the way to create international awareness about the war of independence. The Swadhin Bangla Football Team was established which played 16 matches in India and was officially received by the BFF in 2009. Zakaria Pintoo, who was the captain of that team and the first person to wave Bangladesh's flag in foreign land.

The period before the 1990s saw national soccer fever in league football, specifically in the Dhaka League, which possessed club teams which were famous both at home and abroad. League football was popular even before independence, from the 1940s to 1960s under Pakistan. There were quite a number of well established football clubs in Dhaka in the 1940s, notable clubs which participated in the historical Dhaka Football League from 1933 till the country's partition from Pakistan were Wari Club, Victoria SC, Lakshibazar Club, East End Club, Central Jail XI, Dhaka Wanderers Club and Tejgaon Friends Union, EP Gymkhana, Railways, and Fire service. A match between East Pakistan Governors XI vs. West Bengal XI was held at Dhaka in the late forties, which also attracted thousands of fans into the stadium. The first Dhaka League was won by Bangladeshi club Victoria SC in 1948, three years prior to the Mother Language Movement while still under Pakistani rule. Many of Dhaka league teams went on to become among the most successful teams in the Asian continent (mostly between the 1970s to the early 1990s). The league also went as far as having players from top European teams. The late 1950s and 1960s saw, Bengali football starting to earn more popularity among the people, when the clubs took part in the Aga Khan Gold Cup, which was held Dhaka every year, the President Gold Cup, Dana Cup and Gothia Cup, were also popular competitions at the time, where clubs from all over Asia participated in.

Rise in popularity (1972–2003)
After the establishment of Bangladesh Football Federation (BFF) in 1972, India's Mohun Bagan became the first international football team to visit independent Bangladesh, and on 13 May 1972, they played against the country's unrecognized national team called the Dhaka XI, who defeated the Indian's 1–0. The national team played their first international match against Thailand in the 1973 Merdeka tournament in Malaysia. Enayetur Rahman became the country's first ever goal scorer, during the game. After its membership with FIFA in 1976 and the Asian Football Confederation (AFC), the national team participated in the 1980 AFC Asian Cup. Although Bangladesh failed to win a single game during the competition, their performances against North Korea and Syria impressed the whole country. But the team's best results came at South Asian level where they won the South Asian Football Federation Gold Cup 2003 under György Kottán  and were gold medalists in South Asian Games twice. The country took part in their first FIFA World Cup qualifiers in 1986, and again during the 1990 qualifiers. The team produced a few memorable performances against Iran, China and Thailand along the way. On 4 November 1995, Bangladesh won the 4-nation Tiger Trophy held in Myanmar, which was the country's very first major trophy.

Football was played both in the domestic leagues and abroad. Bangladesh Red were runners-up in the first President Gold Cup in 1981 and won it in 1989. Except that, Bangladeshi clubs bagged two more titles abroad: Quaid-E-Azam Trophy of Pakistan in 1985 and Jigme Dorji Wangchuk Memorial Football of Bhutan in 2003. The early 80s and 90s was the country's golden period, the three traditional Dhaka League giants Mohammedan, Abahani Limited Dhaka and Brothers Union had fans from all over the nation. Soon the country's local clubs began to compete in continental tournaments, as in 1985, Abahani Limited Dhaka took part in the 1985–86 Asian Club Championship, becoming the first Bangladeshi club do so.The domestic competitions helped the popularity of footballs skyrocket in the country and 1988 also saw Mohammedan reach the semi-finals of the Asian Club Championship. Along with the club teams, the national football team was also at the centre of attention of the football fans, who watched their beloved side to fight neck-to-neck before going down to the current Asian giants like Japan, South Korea, Iran, China, and the then strong teams like Syria and Thailand in competitions like Asian Cup qualifiers, World Cup pre-qualifiers and the country's President Gold Cup. The league also attracted internationally renowned players like Emeka Ezeugo and Nasser Hejazi.

Stagnation (2003–2010)
The next decade saw a series of managerial changes in the national team and many famous coaches were appointed like the Austrian György Kottán and German Otto Pfister, who coached Ivory Coast to qualification of their first FIFA World Cup finals in 2006. However, in 2006, Bangladesh reached the quarterfinals of the AFC Challenge Cup under Argentine coach Andres Cruciani and in 2010, Bangladesh won the 11th South Asian Games on home soil under the Serbian Zoran Đorđević, who left in February the same year. In 2007, the Bangladesh Premier League was introduced, replacing the historic Dhaka League which had been the countries main league competition even before its independence, this marked the start of a professional football league and the country's first ever wide open national league were teams outside of Dhaka could participate. The new league was introduced in order to improve the nations footballing standards and to help produce future national stars, as the Bangladesh team were in the midst of bad results.

6 September 2011 was the most unforgettable moment of Bangladeshi football. Lionel Messi and his national team Argentina, played a friendly match against Nigeria at Bangabandhu National Stadium. Bangladeshi footballers were privileged to see the match and Bangladeshi footballers were encouraged and motivated by Argentine footballers. They believe Bangladesh football can go far ahead if world class facilities are brought into the footballing system.

On 4 April 2011, Bangladeshi football legend Kazi Salahuddin was re-elected as the president of Bangladesh Football Federation (BFF). He has come under controversy ever since he took the charge of the BFF board. He took the first initiative of Bangladesh Super League known as "Koti Takar League". His initiations attract international players as well as highly rated international coaches. However, the Super league failed to come into existence.

Downward Spiral (2011–present)
From 2010 to 2020, Bangladeshi football saw an all-time low, with a total of 15 head coaches being sacked by the BFF. This led to both domestic and international football losing popularity among fans and the county falling to its lowest FIFA rank in its history. Since the start of the decade the BFF were forced to recruit expatriate players, as the country failed to produce talents due to no development in grassroots level and an unorganized league structure. Nonetheless, foreign recruitment has not shown any sign of improvement in the national team and could not help the team from its endless freefall. Domestic players also have shown a lack of basic football knowledge and skill, resulting from the shortage of quality academies present in the country, which is essential for player growth. BFF introduced the second-tier league in 2012 as season 5 of Premier League was commencing. The league was named the Bangladesh Championship League, and ever since its inception the league has failed to maintain  professionalism, similar to the country's top-tier.

During the AFC Asia Cup 2019 qualification playoff round 2, under Tom Saintfiet the team suffered its biggest humiliation against Bhutan. Following a 0–0 draw in the first leg in Dhaka, Bhutan inflicted a 3–1 defeat on Bangladesh at the Changlimithang Stadium in Thimphu during the second leg. The result meant that Bangladesh would not be able to take part in AFC and FIFA arranged games for the following two of years.

On 26 June 2019, Dhaka Abahani became the first Bangladeshi club to reach the 2019 AFC Cup knock out phase, by defeating Indian side Minarva Punjab 1–0 on aggregate.

On 17 February 2022, Bashundhara Kings became the first South Asian club to play at a privately-owned football ground to host a match of, as they took on Bangladesh Police FC at the Bashundhara Kings Arena.

Governing body 

The Bangladesh Football Federation (BFF) was established on 15 July 1972 as the governing body, and has been a member of the FIFA since 1974 and AFC in 1973. The federation is responsible for organizing all club championships and the professional league. It is currently working with AFC's Vision Asia programme to improve the domestic football infrastructure.

The BFF is presided by Kazi Salahuddin since April 2008.

Clubs, leagues and championships

Clubs
Successful ones among earlier clubs were Mohammedan SC, Dhaka Wanderers, Victoria SC, Wari Club, East Pakistan Gymkhana and Azad SC.
Among a total of 4,100 clubs, the most renowned clubs today are namely Abahani Limited, Mohammedan SC, Muktijoddha SKS, Brothers Union, Sheikh Jamal Dhanmondi Club , Bashundhara Kings and Sheikh Russel KC.

Domestic tournaments
 Bangladesh Premier League, formerly known as B.League, is the national pro league and the top-tier league in Bangladeshi football. Before that, the Dhaka League was the most renowned and top-tier football league.
 Bangladesh Championship League is the second-tier league in Bangladesh.
 National Football Championship (Bangladesh) was the semi-pro football league replaced by the pro league in 2007 as the top-tier league.
 Federation Cup is the top national cup competition.
 Super Cup is the highest budgeted football tournament organised by BFF.
Bangladesh Women's Football League is the top division women's club football competition of Bangladesh established 2011.

Other regional leagues include the Dhaka League, Chittagong League, Rajshahi League, Cox's Bazar League and the Comilla League.

International tournaments
 AFC Asian Cup
 SAFF Championship
 AFC Challenge Cup
 South Asian Games
 AFC President's Cup (club)
  Sheikh Kamal International Club Cup (club)

Former players
  Monem Munna
  Kazi Salahuddin
  Sheikh Aslam
  Rumman Bin Wali Sabbir
  Sayeed Hassan Kanan
  Kaiser Hamid
  Mohammed Monwar Hossain
  Aminul Haque
  Rajani Kanta Barman

National team achievements

Women's football 

In a country whose population is predominantly Muslim, there is some resistance towards women's football. The women's game has struggled to gain a foothold in Bangladesh in the past and many tournaments dedicated to women have failed. Women's football finally saw light in Bangladesh when the first ever women's football tournament was staged under the Vision Asia programme in November 2007. Eight teams from different districts all over the country took part in the tournament and made it a success amidst security threats.

In October 2008, first women's school football tournament was held under the Vision Bangladesh programme with BFF hopeful of continuing and developing the women's game in the country.

Women's football was included in the 2010 South Asian Games hosted in Dhaka, while the first Women's SAFF Championship was to be held that December in the country. Bangladesh had their first women's national team in the AFC U-19 Women's Championship qualifiers with India, Jordan and Iran in their group. The establishment of the Bangamata Primary School Gold Cup in 2011 by the Primary and Mass Education Department of the government lead to more than a million female students from more than 60,000 primary schools take part in the initial phase of the tournament.

Notable players in foreign leagues
 Anwar Uddin is the first player of South Asian descent to play in England's Premier League.
 Shahed Ahmed (Sporting Bengal United) Former Wycombe Wanderers player.
 Hamza Choudhury a Bangladeshi origin player who currently playing for Leicester City.
 Shamit Shome is a Bangladeshi origin player who is former Montreal Impact player and currently playing for FC Edmonton.
 Yousuf Zulkernain Haque a Bangladeshi origin player currently playing for Ipswich Town U-23 & Bangladesh National U-23 Football Team.

References

External links
 Official website of Bangladesh Football Federation

 
Sports in Bangladesh